George Melvin Cox (November 15, 1904 – December 17, 1995) was a Major League Baseball pitcher who played for the Chicago White Sox in .

External links

1904 births
1995 deaths
Chicago White Sox players
Major League Baseball pitchers
People from Sherman, Texas
Baseball players from Texas